Sabian Cox (born 23 February 1991) is a Trinidadian sprinter.

He won a bronze medal in the 100 metres at the 2010 Central American and Caribbean Junior Championships in Santo Domingo.

References

External links

1991 births
Living people
Trinidad and Tobago male sprinters